Contax Netball Club are an Australian netball team based in Adelaide, South Australia. Their senior team currently plays in the Netball South Australia Premier League. Between 1989 and 1996, Contax represented Netball South Australia in the Esso/Mobil Superleague. They were premiers in 1994. They were originally known as Contax Basketball Club, when netball was known as women's basketball. During the Esso/Mobil Superleague era, they were also referred to as Adelaide Contax. Between 1995 and 2012, when the club was sponsored by ETSA, and then ETSA Utilities, they were known as ETSA Contax.

History

Early years
Contax Basketball Club was formed in 1952 by a group of young girls who had played for the 1951 junior South Australia team. The team was originally based in Woodville. The team was named after the Contax camera. It was suggested by the brother-in-law of the inaugural captain, Margaret Rankin. He was a camera enthusiast and suggested using a short and simple name. Contax won their first South Australia state league premiership in their debut season, defeating Tango in the 1952 grand final. The team was captained by Rankin and included three future Australia internationals – Gaynor Flanagan, Betty Rowe Whelan and Lorraine Wright. Contax initially only organized adult teams. However, from 1966 the club started to introduce junior and youth teams with training taking place in Hectorville. In 1970 Contax won their second premiership, defeating Garville in the grand final. In 1980 Margaret Angove was appointed head coach of the senior Contax team. She remained in the position for sixteen years until 1997, when she was appointed head coach of Adelaide Thunderbirds. In 1986, with a team that included sixteen year old Kathryn Harby and Michelle den Dekker, Contax won their third premiership, defeating  Tango in the grand final.

Rivallry with Garville
In 1988, with a team that included Michelle den Dekker and Kathryn Harby, Contax won their fourth premiership, defeating Garville in the grand final. This marked the beginning a rivalry between Contax and Garville. Between 1986 and 1996 Contax and Garville contested every South Australia state league grand final. The rivalry saw the two clubs compete in nine consecutive state league grand finals, plus one Mobil Super League final, with both clubs winning five finals each. With a team that included Harby and Julie Nykiel, a former Australia women's  basketball international, Contax won their fifth and sixth premierships in 1990 and 1991. After finishing as runners-up to Garville for four successive grand finals, a Contax team featuring Jacqui Delaney won the club's seventh premiership in 1996.

National leagues
Esso/Mobil Superleague
Between 1989 and 1996 Contax represented Netball South Australia in the Esso/Mobil Superleague. With teams that included Kathryn Harby, Michelle Fielke and Julie Nykiel, Contax played in three successive grand finals between 1990 and 1992. In 1990 they lost to 52–42 to Melbourne City. Contax then lost out to Sydney Pulsars in both 1991 and 1992. In 1994 Contax won the title after defeating Garville in controversial circumstances. A Contax team captained by Kathryn Harby and featuring Vicki Wilson and Tania Obst, took on a Garville team featuring Natalie Avellino, Jenny Borlase and Fielke. Wilson was the top scorer and the closely fought match finish level at full time. However Garville claimed they had actually won the match 48–46. It was alleged that during the third quarter, the official scorer accidentally gave one of Garville's goals to Contax. Despite protests from Garville, extra time was played and resulted in a 61–58 win for Contax.

Commonwealth Bank Trophy 
In 1997 Netball Australia replaced the Mobil Superleague with the Commonwealth Bank Trophy league. Contax applied to join the new league but the application was subsequently denied by Netball South Australia. They instead opted to form two brand new teams, Adelaide Thunderbirds and Adelaide Ravens. Together with Cheerio,  Matrics and Oakdale, Contax effectively became a feeder team for Thunderbirds. With a squad coached by former Contax head coach, Margaret Angove, captained by Contax player Kathryn Harby and featuring several Contax players including Jacqui Delaney and Laura von Bertouch, Adelaide Thunderbirds won their first two premierships and grand finals in 1998 and 1999.

ETSA Contax
Between 1995 and 2012 when Contax were sponsored by ETSA, and then ETSA Utilities, the team became known as ETSA Contax. In 2000 with a squad that included Laura and Natalie von Bertouch, Bianca Reddy and Tracey Neville, Contax won their eighth South Australia state league after defeating the Australian Institute of Sport in the grand final. Between 2002 and 2004 Contax won three successive state league premierships. Natalie von Bertouch, Kirby Mutton, Carla Dziwoki and Lauren Nourse were all members of the 2002 winning squad. ETSA Contax subsequently won further premierships in 2006, 2008, 2010 and 2012.

Premier League era
During the 2010s Contax won a further six premierships. During the 2010s their main rivals were Matrics. Between them Contax and Matrics played in every South Australia state league grand final during the decade.

Grand finals
South Australia state league

Esso/Mobil Superleague

Home venue
Contax play the majority of their state league home games at the Netball SA Stadium.

Notable players

Internationals

 Emily Beaton
 Carla Dziwoki
 Maddy Proud
 Kate Shimmin
 Maddy Turner

 Tracey Neville
 Kate Shimmin

 Julie Nykiel

Adelaide Thunderbirds

State / Premier League Best & Fairest

Club Captains

Head coaches

Main sponsors

Premierships
Netball South Australia Premier League
Winners: 1952, 1970, 1986, 1988, 1990, 1991, 1996, 2000, 2002, 2003, 2004, 2006, 2008, 2010, 2012, 2013, 2015, 2017, 2018: 19
Runners up: 1973, 1984, 1989, 1992, 1993, 1994, 1995, 1997, 1999, 2005, 2007, 2009, 2016, 2019, 2020 : 15
Mobil Superleague
Winners: 1994
Runners up: 1990, 1991, 1992

References

External links
  Contax Netball Club on Facebook
  Contax Netball Club on Instagram

Sporting clubs in Adelaide
Netball teams in South Australia
Sports clubs established in 1952
1952 establishments in Australia
Esso/Mobil Superleague teams
South Australia state netball league teams